Domokos Bölöni (Daia, August 11, 1946) is a Romanian Magyar writer and journalist.

After studying in Târnăveni, he studied the Romanian Hungarian language in Târgu Mureş. He has worked as a teacher in Corund and as a journalist for Népújság. He is married and has three children and three grandchildren.

Works
Hullámok boldogsága (1980)
A szárnyas ember, Bucharest, (1986)
Harangoznak Rossz Pistának, Târgu Mureș, (1992)
Egek, harmatozzatok!, (1995)
Bot és fapénz (1999)
A próféták elhallgattak (2002)
A nevető gödör (2004)
Jézus megcibálja Pricskili Dungónak a fülét (2006)
Széles utcán jár a bánat (2007)
Elindult a hagymalé (2009)
Micsobur reinkarnációja (2010)
Küküllőmadár (2011)

Prizes
 Igaz Szó  (1985)
 Magyar Napló Önismeret az ezredfordulón (1988)
 Látó (1992)

Sources

External links
Erdélyi Magyar Írók Ligája

1946 births
Living people
Romanian writers
Romanian people of Hungarian descent
People from Mureș County